The Ferrari 712P is a purpose-built Group 7 prototype, designed, developed and built by Scuderia Ferrari specifically designed to compete Can-Am sports car races from 1970 to 1974. The 7 refers to the displacement of the engine in liters, the 12 refers to the number of cylinders, and the P stands for Prototype.

Development history
The Ferrari 712P was the successor model of the Ferrari 612P Can-Am car, and was based on the Ferrari 512S with chassis number 1010. The chassis had already had a checkered history and was given a new, open body. The 7-liter V12 engine was first used in the 612 Can-Am at the end of 1969; it developed  @ 8000 rpm.

Racing history
The car made its debut at the 1970 Can-Am race at Watkins Glen. It was driven by Mario Andretti, who finished fourth in the race. The Can-Am missions were handled by the North American Racing Team of Luigi Chinetti, who signed the French Jean-Pierre Jarier in 1972. Jarier contested the races at Watkins Glen and Road Atlanta in 1972. Brian Redman drove the car in 1973.

Chinetti used the 712 Can-Am sporadically in races for five years until 1974, when the car was sold. In 2005, the racing car was driven at the AvD-Oldtimer-Grand-Prix at the Nürburgring in historic motorsport.

The 712 was rarely used. The Scuderia itself only used the prototype once, in a sports car race in Imola, which Arturo Merzario won.

References

Sports prototypes
Can-Am cars
Ferrari vehicles